John Lewis Barkley (August 28, 1895 – April 14, 1966) was a United States Army Medal of Honor recipient of World War I. Born in Blairstown, Missouri, near Holden, Barkley served as a Private First Class in Company K, 4th Infantry Regiment, 3rd Division. He earned the medal while fighting near Cunel, France, on October 7, 1918. His autobiography, "Scarlet Fields:  The Combat Memoir of a World War I Medal of Honor Hero," details his service leading up to and following his Medal of Honor action.  The book draws comparisons as the American literary response to "All Quiet on the Western Front."

Barkley died on April 14, 1966, and is buried in Forest Hill Calvary Cemetery in Kansas City, Missouri.

Medal of Honor citation
Rank and organization: Private First Class, U.S. Army, Company K, 4th Infantry, 3rd Division. Place and date: At Cunel, France; October 7, 1918. Entered service at: Blairstown, Missouri. Birth:  August 28, 1895; Blairstown, Missouri. General Orders: War Department, General Orders No. 44 (April 2, 1919).

Citation:

Private First Class Barkley, who was stationed in an observation post half a kilometer from the German line, on his own initiative repaired a captured enemy machinegun and mounted it in a disabled French tank near his post. Shortly afterward, when the enemy launched a counterattack against our forces, Private First Class Barkley got into the tank, waited under the hostile barrage until the enemy line was abreast of him and then opened fire, completely breaking up the counterattack and killing and wounding a large number of the enemy. Five minutes later an enemy 77-millimeter gun opened fire on the tank pointblank. One shell struck the drive wheel of the tank, but this soldier nevertheless remained in the tank and after the barrage ceased broke up a second enemy counterattack, thereby enabling our forces to gain and hold Hill 25.

Military awards 
Barkley's military decorations and awards include:

See also

List of Medal of Honor recipients for World War I

References

External links

 
 Trout, Steven: Barkley, John Lewis, in: 1914-1918-online. International Encyclopedia of the First World War.

1895 births
1966 deaths
People from Kansas City, Missouri
United States Army Medal of Honor recipients
United States Army non-commissioned officers
United States Army personnel of World War I
World War I recipients of the Medal of Honor
Burials in Missouri
Military personnel from Missouri